Andréa Maria Pereira Britto (born 8 December 1973) is a Brazilian athlete who specialises in the shot put. She won multiple medals on the regional level.

She has personal bests of 16.90 metres outdoors (2007) and 16.50 metres indoors (2010).

Competition record

References

 

1973 births
Living people
Brazilian female shot putters
Pan American Games athletes for Brazil
Athletes (track and field) at the 2007 Pan American Games
21st-century Brazilian women
20th-century Brazilian women